Morzycko Lake (Polish: Jezioro Morzycko; German: Mohriner See) is a lake located in the Myślibórz Lake District, in the eastern outer suburbs of the town of Moryń, in the West Pomeranian Voivodeship, Gmina Moryń, in Poland. The lake is part of the Cedynia Landscape Park. 

Morzycko Lake is the ninth-deepest lake in Poland.

References

Lakes of Poland
Lakes of West Pomeranian Voivodeship